Bolshaya Kumina is a river in Perm Krai, Russia, a left tributary of Asovka which in turn is a tributary of Barda.

References 

Rivers of Perm Krai